Koudous Seihon 5 March 1986 is a Burkinabé actor best known for his roles in the Italian films Mediterranea and A Ciambra.

Early life

While from Burkina Faso,  Seihon eventually left the country to seek employment in Italy, where he worked as an orange picker and African community leader.

Acting career

In 2015, Seihon was cast by Jonas Carpignano to star in Mediterranea, a role for which Seihon received numerous accolades. Two years later, Seihon garnered a major part in Carpiganon's second feature, A Ciambra.

Personal life

Siehon speaks several languages, including Italian, French, Arabic, Mossi, and Bissa.

Awards and nominations

References

External links
 

21st-century Burkinabé male actors
Living people
Year of birth missing (living people)
Burkinabé male film actors